Valery Tarasenka (born 1 September 1981) is a Belarusian professional footballer coach and former player.

Career

Coaching career
In February 2016, it was confirmed that Tarasenka had returned to BATE Borisov as a youth coach. After three years, he joined the coaching staff of the BATE's first team in January 2019 under head coach Alyaksey Baha. He left BATE at the end of December 2019.

In January 2020, he followed Alyaksey Baha, as his assistant coach, to Lithuanian club FK Žalgiris.

Honours
BATE Borisov
Belarusian Premier League champion: 2002

References

External links

1981 births
Living people
Belarusian footballers
Association football defenders
Belarusian expatriate footballers
Belarusian expatriate sportspeople in Kazakhstan
Expatriate footballers in Kazakhstan
FC BATE Borisov players
FC Gomel players
FC Neman Grodno players
FC Partizan Minsk players
FC Granit Mikashevichi players
FC Tobol players
FC Torpedo-BelAZ Zhodino players
FC Dynamo Brest players
FC Gorodeya players
FC Slavia Mozyr players